Roy Hardemon (born August 12, 1962) is an American politician who served in the Florida House of Representatives from the 108th district from 2016 to 2018.

References

1962 births
Living people
Democratic Party members of the Florida House of Representatives